Ponte do Castelo is a bridge in Portugal. It is located in Aveiro District.

See also
List of bridges in Portugal

Bridges in Aveiro District